Zlatko Zebić (Serbian Cyrillic: Златко Зебић, born January 8, 1979, in Loznica) is a retired Serbian football player. He also holds American citizenship. His last club was Chicago Storm in the Ultimate Soccer League in the United States.

During his career in Europe, he has played for Serbian clubs FK Loznica, Spartak Subotica, Swiss Young Boys Bern and AC Bellinzona, Slovak MFK Košice and Italian AC Parma and A.S. Varese 1910. After moving to U.S. in 2005, beside playing for Chicago Storm, he has also played with Rockford Rampage.

References

External links
Profile and stats at Srbijafudbal

Living people
1979 births
Sportspeople from Loznica
Serbian footballers
Serbian expatriate footballers
FK Loznica players
FK Spartak Subotica players
FK Mačva Šabac players
BSC Young Boys players
Expatriate footballers in Switzerland
Serbian expatriate sportspeople in Switzerland
FC VSS Košice players
Slovak Super Liga players
Expatriate footballers in Slovakia
Serbian expatriate sportspeople in Slovakia
S.S.D. Varese Calcio players
Expatriate footballers in Italy
Serbian expatriate sportspeople in Italy
Expatriate soccer players in the United States
Serbian expatriate sportspeople in the United States
Association football midfielders
Association football forwards